Chester Caddas (July 30, 1935 – July 27, 2019) was an American football coach.  He served as the head football coach at the University of the Pacific from 1972 to 1978 and at Colorado State University in 1981, compiling a career college football record of 38–44–2.

Caddas graduated from Murray State College—now known as Murray State University—in 1957.  He died on July 27, 2019, in Lexington, Kentucky.

Head coaching record

References

1935 births
2019 deaths
Colorado State Rams football coaches
Pacific Tigers football coaches
Purdue Boilermakers football coaches
Vanderbilt Commodores football coaches
Murray State University alumni
Sportspeople from Memphis, Tennessee